The Ooten House, located at 507 W 15th St. in Larned, Kansas, is a Lustron house built in 1950.  It was listed on the National Register of Historic Places in 2001.

It is a Newport Deluxe Lustron model, built by Brack Implements of Great Bend, Kansas.  It was originally placed on land about  outside Great Bend.  It was moved to its current location some years later.

References

Houses on the National Register of Historic Places in Kansas
Houses completed in 1950
Lustron houses
Houses in Pawnee County, Kansas